The Cabinet of the Philippines (usually referred to as the Cabinet or Gabinete) consists of the heads of the largest part of the executive branch of the national government of the Philippines. Currently, it includes the secretaries of 22 executive departments and the heads of other several other minor agencies and offices that are subordinate to the president of the Philippines.

The cabinet secretaries are tasked to advise the president on the different affairs of the state like agriculture, budget, energy, finance, education, social welfare, national defense, foreign policy, and the like.

They are nominated by the president and then presented to the Commission on Appointments, a body of the Congress of the Philippines that confirms all appointments made by the president, for confirmation or rejection. If the presidential appointees are approved, they are sworn into office, receive the title "Secretary", and begin to function their duties.

Constitutional and legal basis

Appointment 
Article 7, Section 16 of the Constitution of the Philippines says that the President

Cabinet and cabinet-level officials 

The people listed below form the cabinet and are the heads of the current executive departments of the Philippines. The officials under these departments are appointed with the rank of Secretary. Appointed officials who are not confirmed by the Commission on Appointments, as required by law, will take the office under acting capacity, or as officer-in-charge, depending on the appointment released and approved by the President. The current structure of the Cabinet of the Philippines are based on the executive orders reorganizing the offices under its jurisdiction, given the fact that the Constitution allows executive privileges to reorganize its structure.

Official Filipino names of the agencies were derived from Komisyon ng Wikang Filipino and Department of Budget and Management.

Departments and Executive Offices of the Philippine Government 
{| class="wikitable" style="font-size:95%; text-align:center;"
|-
! Department
! Acronym
! Office
! Incumbent
! In office since
|-
| Department of Foreign Affairs
| DFA
| Secretary of Foreign Affairs
| Enrique Manalo
| July 1, 2022
|-
| Office of the Executive Secretary
| OES
| Executive Secretary
| Lucas Bersamin
| September 27, 2022
|-
| Department of Finance
| DOF
| Secretary of Finance
| Benjamin Diokno
| June 30, 2022
|-
| Department of Justice
| DOJ
| Secretary of Justice
| Jesus Crispin Remulla
| June 30, 2022
|-
| Department of Agriculture
| DA
| Secretary of Agriculture
| Ferdinand Marcos Jr.(Concurrent capacity)
| June 30, 2022
|-
| Department of Public Works and Highways
| DPWH
| Secretary of Public Works and Highways
| Manuel Bonoan
| June 30, 2022
|-
| Department of Education
| DepEd
| Secretary of Education
| Sara Duterte(Concurrent capacity)
| June 30, 2022
|-
| Department of Labor and Employment
| DOLE
| Secretary of Labor and Employment
| Bienvenido Laguesma
| June 30, 2022
|-
| Department of National Defense
| DND
| Secretary of National Defense
| Carlito Galvez Jr.(Ad interim)
| January 9, 2023
|-
| Department of Health
| DOH
| Secretary of Health
| Maria Rosario Vergeire (Officer-in-charge)
| July 14, 2022
|-
| Department of Trade and Industry
| DTI
| Secretary of Trade and Industry
| Alfredo Pascual
| June 30, 2022
|-
| Department of Migrant Workers
| DMW
| Secretary of Migrant Workers
| Susan Ople
| June 30, 2022
|-
| Department of Human Settlements and Urban Development
| DHSUD
| Secretary of Human Settlements and Urban Development
| Jose Rizalino Acuzar
| July 29, 2022
|-
| Department of Social Welfare and Development
| DSWD
| Secretary of Social Welfare and Development
| Rexlon Gatchalian(Ad interim)
| January 31, 2023
|-
| Department of Agrarian Reform
| DAR
| Secretary of Agrarian Reform
| Conrado Estrella III
| June 30, 2022
|-
| Department of Environment and Natural Resources
| DENR
| Secretary of Environment and Natural Resources
| Maria Antonia Loyzaga
| July 12, 2022
|-
| Department of the Interior and Local Government
| DILG
| Secretary of the Interior and Local Government
| Benjamin Abalos Jr.
| class="nowrap" | June 30, 2022
|-
| Department of Tourism
| DOT
| Secretary of Tourism
| Maria Christina Frasco
| June 30, 2022
|-
| Department of Transportation
| DOTr
| Secretary of Transportation
| Jaime Bautista
| June 30, 2022
|-
| Department of Science and Technology
| DOST
| Secretary of Science and Technology
| Renato Solidum Jr.
| July 22, 2022
|-
| Department of Budget and Management
| DBM
| Secretary of Budget and Management
| Amenah Pangandaman
| June 30, 2022
|-
| Department of Energy
| DOE
| Secretary of Energy
| Raphael Lotilla
| July 11, 2022
|-
| Department of Information and Communications Technology
| DICT
| Secretary of Information and Communications Technology
| Ivan John Uy
| June 30, 2022
|-
| National Economic and Development Authority
| NEDA
| Director-General of the National Economic and Development Authority and Secretary of Socio-economic Planning
| Arsenio Balisacan
| June 30, 2022
|-
| Presidential Communications Office
| PCO
| Secretary of the Presidential Communications Office
|Cheloy Velicaria-Garafil
| January 10, 2023
|-
| National Security Council
| NSC
| National Security Adviser
| Eduardo Año(Ad interim)
| January 14, 2023
|-
| Presidential Management Staff
| PMS
| Secretary of the Presidential Management Staff
| Elaine T. Masukat(Officer-in-charge)| January 3, 2023
|-
| Office of the Solicitor General
| OSG
| Solicitor General
| Menardo Guevarra
| June 30, 2022
|-
| Office of the Chief Presidential Legal Counsel
| OCPLC
| Chief Presidential Legal Counsel
| Juan Ponce Enrile
| June 30, 2022
|-
| Presidential Legislative Liaison Office
| PLLO
| Presidential Adviser on Legislative Affairs and Head of the Presidential Legislative Liaison Office
|  Mark Llandro Mendoza
| August 23, 2022
|-
| Office of the Special Assistant to the President
| OSAP
| Special Assistant to the President
| Antonio Lagdameo Jr.
| June 30, 2022
|-
|Office of the Presidential Assistant for the Visayas
|OPAV
|Presidential Assistant for the Visayas
|Terence Calatrava
|December 6, 2022
|-
| Office of the Presidential Adviser on Peace, Reconciliation and Unity
|OPAPRU
|Presidential Adviser on Peace, Reconciliation and Unity
|Usec. Isidro L. Purisima (Acting)
|January 9, 2023
|}

 Agencies, authorities and offices under the Office of the President 
The following officials are appointed on the following agencies directly under the supervision of the Office of the President. The current structure of these agencies and offices are based on Executive Order No. 1, s. 2022, wherein all agencies and offices under and attached to the Office of the President shall be under the supervision and control of the Office of Executive Secretary (Section 5''). Meanwhile, officials under these agencies and officies can either have a rank of secretary or undersecretary, and therefore are permitted to attend Cabinet meetings for special purposes.

See also 
 Executive departments of the Philippines
 List of female cabinet secretaries of the Philippines

References 

 
Executive branch of the government of the Philippines
Politics of the Philippines
Political organizations based in the Philippines
Philippines